Riff is a German language surname. It stems from a reduced form of the male given name Ricfried. Notable people with the name include:

Emma Riff (2000), French modern pentathlete
Sepp Riff (1928–2000), Austrian cinematographer

References 

German-language surnames
French-language surnames
Surnames from given names